Kiwitrechus karenscottae is a species of beetle in the family Carabidae, the only species in the genus Kiwitrechus.

References

Trechinae